Black Creek is a tributary of the Genesee River that runs for  in western New York, United States. The creek begins in Middlebury in Wyoming County and runs north for roughly the first half of its course and east for the other half, eventually joining the Genesee River in Chili, Monroe County. As of 2000, 40,000 residents lived in the creek's drainage area.

See also
List of New York rivers

References

Rivers of New York (state)
Rivers of Wyoming County, New York
Rivers of Genesee County, New York
Rivers of Monroe County, New York